Parazacco spilurus, also known as the Predaceous chub, is a species of fish in the family Cyprinidae distributes in the Pearl River system, the Hainan Island and northern Vietnam.

References

Xenocyprinae
Cyprinid fish of Asia
Freshwater fish of China
Fish of Vietnam
Fish described in 1868
Taxa named by Albert Günther